Olli & Lissa is a series of three action video games: Olli & Lissa: The Ghost of Shilmore Castle (1987), Olli & Lissa II: Halloween (1987), and Olli & Lissa 3: The Candlelight Adventure (1989).

Plot and gameplay
The games see the protagonist duo Olli & Lissa solve a mystery. The titles play as flick-screen games.

Commercial performance
The titles became significantly successful as budget games. It was the UK's top-selling ZX Spectrum game in January 1987.

Critical reception

The Ghost of Shilmore Castle
CVG Magazine praised the title as being both addictive and humorous. Commodore User Magazine thought the title was a fine example of the developer's good "cheapo games".

The Candlelight Adventure
Commodore Format Magazine felt the game exuded originality and style. ZZap!64 Magazine felt the graphics were imaginative and varied.

References

External links
 Tilt review
 Your Sinclair review
 Crash review

1987 video games
1989 video games
Amstrad CPC games
Commodore 64 games
Halloween video games
Platform games
Video games developed in the United Kingdom
ZX Spectrum games